Wardlow station is an at-grade light rail station on the A Line of the Los Angeles Metro Rail system. The station is located on the A Line's exclusive right-of-way (the historic route of the Pacific Electric Railway) that parallels Pacific Place, at its intersection with Wardlow Street, after which the station is named, in the Wrigley neighborhood of Long Beach, California.

The Willow and Wardlow stations are the two A Line stations closest to the Long Beach Airport. The A Line maintenance and storage yard is located between the Wardlow and Del Amo stations.

Service

Station layout

Hours and frequency

Connections 
, the following connections are available:

References

A Line (Los Angeles Metro) stations
Transportation in Long Beach, California
Railway stations in the United States opened in 1990
1990 establishments in California
Pacific Electric stations